Senecio haloragis is a species of the genus Senecio and family Asteraceae and a native of Chile.

References

External links

haloragis
Flora of Chile